Mohács is a district in eastern part of Baranya County, Hungary. Mohács is also the name of the town where the district seat is found. The district is located in the Southern Transdanubia Statistical Region.

Geography 
Mohács District borders with Bonyhád District and Szekszárd District (Tolna County) to the north, Baja District (Bács-Kiskun County) to the east, the Croatian county of Osijek-Baranja to the south, Siklós District, Bóly District and Pécsvárad District to the west. The number of the inhabited places in Mohács District is 26.

Municipalities 
The district has 1 town and 25 villages.
(ordered by population, as of 1 January 2012)

The bolded municipality is city.

See also
List of cities and towns in Hungary

References

External links
 Postal codes of the Mohács District

Districts in Baranya County